Nina Simone with Strings is an album by Nina Simone. The album was released after she had left Colpix Records. The tracks on the album were assembled by combining unreleased material with recordings of strings.

In the UK, the album's version of "I Loves You Porgy" was used in television commercials in 1997 by the mobile telephone operator Orange.

Track listing
 "I Loves You Porgy" (George Gershwin, Ira Gershwin) - 4:00
 "Blackbird" (Nina Simone) -  2:06
 "Falling in Love Again (Can't Help It)" (Friedrich Hollaender, Sammy Lerner) -  2:38
 "Baubles Bangles and Beads" (Robert Wright, George Forrest) -  2:04
 "Spring Is Here" (Richard Rodgers, Lorenz Hart) -  2:37
 "That's All" (Bob Haymes, Alan Brandt) -  2:24
 "Chain Gang (The Work Song)" (Nat Adderley) -  2:40
 "The Man with a Horn" (Eddie DeLange, Jack Jenney, Bonnie Lake) -  3:17
 "Porgy I Is Your Woman Now (Bess, You is My Woman)" (George and Ira Gershwin) -  3:22
 "Gimme a Pigfoot (And a Bottle of Beer)" (Bessie Smith) -  2:05

References

1966 albums
Nina Simone albums
Colpix Records albums